Akori may refer to:

 Akori, Lori Province, Armenia
 The Armenian name of Yenidoğan, Aralık, Iğdır Province, Turkey